Tom Junod (born April 9, 1958) is an American journalist. He is the recipient of two National Magazine Awards from the American Society of Magazine Editors.

Early life
In 1980, Junod graduated with a Bachelor of Arts degree in English from the State University of New York at Albany.

Career
Junod worked as a writer for Esquire magazine beginning in 1997, after following editor David Granger to the magazine from GQ. He also worked for Atlanta magazine, Life, and Sports Illustrated. Junod has published award-winning pieces for several magazines. Among his notable works are The Abortionist, The Rapist Says He's Sorry, The Falling Man and a controversial 2001 piece on R.E.M. lead singer Michael Stipe, in which he satirically fabricated information for an interview that never happened. As of November 2019, he is a writer for ESPN The Magazine.

Junod is also noted for his Esquire profile of Fred Rogers. Junod has stated that his encounter with Rogers changed his perspective on life. The event is the premise of the 2019 feature film A Beautiful Day in the Neighborhood. Junod also appeared in the critically acclaimed documentary Won't You Be My Neighbor? (2018).

Among his controversial articles, Junod came to regret the tone of his 1997 profile of Kevin Spacey for Esquire that "more or less outed the actor". At the time Spacey described the profile as "mean-spirited" and "homophobic" and called for a boycott of both the author and publication. "That story had the reek of bad faith to it, to be quite honest with you," Junod admitted when interviewed by Atlanta Magazine in 2019, noting that the negative response to his Kevin Spacey profile had stalled his career prior to his Fred Rogers assignment.

Awards
Junod is the recipient of two National Magazine Awards from the American Society of Magazine Editors; one for a profile of John Britton, an abortion doctor, and one for a profile of a rapist undergoing therapy while enduring what is known as "civil commitment" finalist for the award.

In 2011, Junod won the James Beard Award for his essay "My Mom Couldn't Cook", published in Esquire in September 2010.

References

External links
Interview with Tom Junod on NPR's All Things Considered
Junod's The Falling Man feature in Esquire
Junod's Can You Say...Hero? profile in Esquire

American male journalists
Life (magazine) photojournalists
American magazine staff writers
University at Albany, SUNY alumni
1958 births
Living people
20th-century American journalists
21st-century American journalists
GQ (magazine)
Sports Illustrated photojournalists
Esquire (magazine) people
ESPN people